Roshan Punyajith Wijesinghe Guneratne (26 January 1962, Colombo – 21 July 2005, California) was a Sri Lankan cricketer who played in one Test in 1983.

School times
He is an old boy of Nalanda College Colombo and captained the college's cricket team in 1982.

International career
Roshan is the 24th Sri Lanka Test Cap (Sri Lanka Vs Australia at Kandy 1982/3).

Death
He died suddenly of a heart attack at the age of 43 in California.

See also
 One-Test wonder

References

External links
 
 Roshan Guneratne dies at 43

1962 births
2005 deaths
Basnahira North cricketers
Sri Lanka Test cricketers
Sri Lankan cricketers
Alumni of Nalanda College, Colombo